Ischionodonta semirubra' is a species of beetle in the family Cerambycidae. It was described by Hermann Burmeister in 1865.

References

Ischionodonta
Beetles described in 1865